(17511) 1992 QN is a small, bright Apollo asteroid discovered on August 29 1992 by American astronomers Eleanor Helin and Jeff Alu at the Palomar Observatory, California, United States. It is a near-Earth asteroid whose orbit crosses that of Mars and Earth (a Mars and Earth-crossing asteroid). On January 18 1996, it passed Earth at a distance of 0.158848 AU (23.763 million km), and on July 12 2027, it will pass our planet again at a distance of 0.161858 AU (24.214 million km). (17511) 1992 QN's orbit is similar to that of Apollo asteroid 2010 JG.

References

External links
 NEODyS-2 statistics of (17511) 1992 QN
 JPL Small-Body Database's orbit diagram and statistics of (17511) 1992 QN

017511
017511
19920829